Nancy Magdy, is an Egyptian beauty pageant titleholder who was crowned as Miss Egypt Earth 2014. Nancy won alongside Lara Debbana for Miss Universe 2014 and Amina Ashraf for Miss World 2014. She was crowned by the reigning Miss Earth winner, Alyz Henrich.

Nancy is the first winner for Miss Earth from Egypt after four years of absence from the said pageant.

Nancy now is the Tv presenter of Alqahera Alyoum live show on OSN

Pageantry

Miss Egypt 2014
When the reigning Miss Earth 2013, Alyz Henrich, traveled to Egypt to be the special guest for the United Nations' Youth Conference for Environment and Biodiversity in Hurghada, Egypt on March 7 to 11, the Let's Take Care of the Planet - Egypt (LTCP) acquired the franchise for Egypt from Miss Earth. The LTCP partnered with Face to Face Modeling Agency that sends its winners to Miss Universe and Miss World. Nancy joined the pageant through auditions.

Since there is a partnership between the two organizations, part of the pre-pageant were the environmental activities spearheaded by LTCP together with the Arab Academy for Science and Technology, among others, where Alyz and Tereza participated.

At the end of the coronation night, Nancy was crowned as Miss Egypt Earth 2014. She was included in the top five finalists. The runners-up are Heba Hesham and Shaymaa Mohamed. Also invited in the event were Tereza Fajksova and Carousel Productions' Vice President Peachy Veneracion among others.

Part of the post pageant activities of Miss Egypt 2014 is the 10th anniversary of LTCP where Nancy, along with the other winners, attended.

Miss Earth 2014
By winning Miss Egypt Earth, Nancy travelled to the Philippines in November to compete with 84 other candidates to be Alyz Henrich's successor as Miss Earth and she placed in the Top 16.

References

External links 

 (2010)

Living people
1994 births
Miss Egypt winners
Miss Earth 2014 contestants
Models from Cairo